Macaiamo is a village in Ancuabe District in Cabo Delgado Province in northeastern Mozambique.

It is located west of the town of Mesa, Mozambique.

References

External links 
Satellite map at Maplandia.com 

Populated places in Ancuabe District